This is a list of Brazilian television related events from 1998.

Events

Debuts

International
2 February - / Rupert (TV Cultura)
/ Salty's Lighthouse (TV Cultura)

Television shows

1970s
Turma da Mônica (1976–present)

1990s
Malhação (1995–present)
Cocoricó (1996–present)

Ending this year

Births

Deaths

See also
1998 in Brazil